Elections to Weymouth and Portland Borough Council were held on 6 May 1999.  One third of the council was up for election and the council stayed under no overall control.

After the election, the composition of the council was
Labour 15
Liberal Democrat 12
Independent 6
Conservative 2

Election result

References
1999 Weymouth and Portland election result

1999
1999 English local elections
20th century in Dorset